Farley Mount is a hill and one of the highest points in Hampshire. It is located within Farley Mount Country Park, situated  about four miles west of the historic city of Winchester, Hampshire. It is locally famous for being the subject of a folk song, 'On Farley Mount'. It featured the line oh on Farley Mount the clouds drift by, rustling the trees, on Farley mount I wonder why, what troubles you and I, blue is the sky and so are your eyes, oh left alone on Farley Mount. It is believed to date back to at least the sixteenth century and is still sung in pubs in the area.

Monument 

The monument is the subject of Timothy Corsellis' poem 'the first great goodbye'. Corsellis, an alumnus of Winchester college who lived in the early-mid 20th century, wrote 'I'll plant myself on Cheesefoot Head/and miles of Hampshire will I tread,/I'll turn my nose to Farley Mount/No ugly bypass need I count, And in a second I'll be there/ Or in the beech woods standing near'. 

There are plaques on the interior and exterior of the monument, which read:

Underneath lies buried a horse, the property of Paulet St. John Esq., that in the month of September 1733 leaped into a chalk pit twenty-five feet deep afoxhuntiing with his master on his back and in October 1734 he won the Hunters Plate on Worthy Downs and was rode by his owner and was entered in the name of "Beware Chalk Pit".
The folk band Contraband recorded "Beware Chalk Pit" by Graham Penny, featuring the words:
There's a tale I'll tell to you, tis remarkable but true, of Sir Paulet St. John and his noble steed, an event as you shall see, back in seventeen thirty three, of which Hampshire gentlemen should all take heed. CHORUS: Beware Chalk Pit, Beware Chalk Pit, as you go galloping o'er the downs, Beware Chalk Pit.

References

Hills of Hampshire
Country parks in Hampshire